Ladies' single skating was contested between 23 and 25 February 1994. 27 skaters from 16 nations participated.

Results
SP = Short program. FS = Free skating. TFP = Total factor points. TFP =  + FS. Lowest TFP wins.

Referees
 Britta Lindgren
 Gerhardt Bubník (assistant referee)

Judges
 Wendy Utley
 Jan Olesinski
 Jarmila Portová
 Alfred Korytek
 Yang Jiasheng
 Margaret Ann Wier
 Noriko Shirota
 Audrey Williams
 Jan Hoffmann
 Monique Petis (substitute)

In film
Tonya Harding's and Nancy Kerrigan's participation in the event is part of the story of the 2017 American film I, Tonya.

L
1994 in women's figure skating
Fig